is a public park in Itabashi Ward, Tokyo, Japan.  The ruins of Akatsuka Castle can be found at the west end of the park.

Facilities
Baseball field (1)
Tennis courts (7)
Athletics field (300m track)
Barbecue area

Hilly area
The park contains a 70 m wide hilly area, which corresponds to the cliffline of the Musashino Terrace, and it extends for 2.3 km. Part of this area is a bird sanctuary. Further, soft windflower, the official flower of Itabashi Ward, grows naturally in a forest that covers these hills (the Daimon area of Akatsuka Park). This is the largest area of wild soft windflower growth in Tokyo. They grow over an area as large as 20 meters deep and 200 meters east and west.

Access
By train:
10 minutes’ walk from Takashimadaira Station on the  Toei Mita Line

See also
 Parks and gardens in Tokyo
 National Parks of Japan

References

 Website of Tokyo Convention & Visitors Bureau

External links
 Bureau of construction, Japan
Parks and gardens in Tokyo